Eufaula High School can refer to
Eufaula High School (Eufaula, Alabama)
Eufaula High School (Eufaula, Oklahoma)